The 1925 Liège–Bastogne–Liège was the 15th edition of the Liège–Bastogne–Liège cycle race and was held on 14 June 1925. The race started and finished in Liège. The race was won by Georges Ronsse.

General classification

References

1925
1925 in Belgian sport